Jahangir Shirgasht oglu Jahangirov (20 July 1921 – 25 March 1992) was a Soviet and Azerbaijani composer, conductor and choirmaster; he was named People's Artists of the Azerbaijan SSR in 1964.

Biography
Jahangir Jahangirov was born on 20 July 1921 in Balakhany township of Baku, Azerbaijan Democratic Republic. He graduated from musical school named after Asaf Zeynally and then from Baku Academy of Music. From 1944 to 1960, he led the choir of Broadcasting Committee of the Azerbaijan SSR. Majority of songs, composed by him for the first time were played by the chorus, which he led. After that he was the artistic director of the Song and Dance Ensemble at Azerbaijan State Philharmonic Hall. In 1950, Jahangir Jahangirov was awarded the USSR State Prize, and in 1963, he received the status of People’s Artist of the Azerbaijan SSR.

Compositions
Jahangir Jahangirov is the author of a lot of famous musical compositions. On the other side of Araz (1949) vocal-symphonic poem, A Song about Friendship (1956), Fuzuli (1959), Nasimi (1973) suites, Sabir (1962), Huseyn Javid-59 (1984), Great Victory (1985) (dedicated to the 40th anniversary of the victory in Great Patriotic War) oratorios, Azad (1957), Khananda’s Fortune (1978) operas are among them. Besides that, the composer composed music for films Indomitable Kura, Koroglu, and Unsubdued Battalion.

See also
 List of People's Artists of the Azerbaijan SSR

References

1920 births
1992 deaths
20th-century classical composers
20th-century male musicians
Musicians from Baku
Baku Academy of Music alumni
Stalin Prize winners
Recipients of the Order of the Red Banner of Labour
Azerbaijani composers
Azerbaijani opera composers
Azerbaijani film score composers
Male film score composers
Soviet Azerbaijani people
Soviet film score composers
Soviet male composers
Soviet opera composers
Burials at Alley of Honor
People's Artists of the Azerbaijan SSR